Harry John Willmott Gyles (28 June 1880 – 2 February 1959) was an Australian rules footballer who played with Carlton in the Victorian Football League (VFL).

Family
One of his sons, Nathaniel Thomas Gyles, who served in the RAAF in World War II, was killed in action in Europe.

Municipal councillor
He was a councillor with the Essendon City Council for 12 years, and was Mayor in 1942–1943.

Notes

References
 De Bolfo, Tony, "Carlton, Community and Harry Gyles", carltonfc.com.au, 20 January 2012.
 Holmesby, Russell & Main, Jim (2009). The Encyclopedia of AFL Footballers: every AFL/VFL player since 1897 (8th ed.), (Seaford), BAS Publishing.

External links 
		
Harry Gyles's profile at Blueseum

1880 births
1959 deaths
Australian rules footballers from Melbourne
Carlton Football Club players
People from Carlton, Victoria
Politicians from Melbourne